The Southwestern League was the name of four former minor league baseball leagues that operated in the Southwestern United States.  The second league, also known as the Oklahoma State League, was in operation for the 1904 season.  The third league operated from 1921 to 1926.  The fourth league, formerly the Longhorn League, operated from 1956 to 1957 before changing its name to the Sophomore League.

Southwestern League (1889)

Member teams

Former 

The following teams were members of the first Southwestern League (in alphabetical order):

 Shreveport Grays – 1889

Southwestern League (1904)

Member teams

Former 

The following teams were members of the second Southwestern League (in alphabetical order):

 Chickasha Indians – 1904
 El Reno Indians – 1904
 Enid Evangelists – 1904
 Guthrie Blues – 1904
 Oklahoma City Mets – 1904
 Shawnee Browns – 1904
 Tulsa Indians (later renamed Tulsa Redmen) – 1904

Southwestern League (1921-26) 

In 1923, Mose Solomon hit 49 home runs for Hutchinson, according to Topps and the 1977 card back of Paul Blair.

Member teams

Former 

The following teams were members of the third Southwestern League (in alphabetical order):

 Arkansas City Osages - 1924-26
 Bartlesville Bearcats - 1923; Bartlesville Braves - 1921; Bartlesville Grays - 1922
 Blackwell Blues - 1924; Blackwell Gassers - 1925-26
 Coffeyville Refiners - 1921-24
 Cushing Oilers - 1921; Cushing Refiners - 1925
 Emporia Traders - 1924
 Enid Harvesters - 1924;  Enid Boosters - 1925-26
 Eureka Oilers - 1924; 1926
 Hutchinson Wheat Shockers - 1922-23
 Independence Producers - 1921-24
 Miami Indians - 1921
 Muskogee Mets - 1921-23
 Newton Railroaders - 1924
 Ottawa Chiefs- 1924
 Parsons Parsons - 1921
 Pittsburg (KS) Pirates - 1921
 Ponca City Poncans - 1926
 Salina Millers - 1922-26
 Sapulpa Sappers - 1921-22; Sapulpa Yanks - 1923
 Shawnee Braves - 1925
 Topeka Kaws - 1922-23; Topeka Senators - 1925-26

Southwestern League (1956-57)

History 

In 1947 the Longhorn League began play with teams in New Mexico and Texas.  In 1956 the league changed its name to the Southwestern League, played for two seasons, and then changed its name again (to the Sophomore League). The 1957 season ended with only four teams.

Member teams

Former 

The following teams were members of the fourth Southwestern League (in alphabetical order):

 Ballinger Westerners - 1956-1957 
 Carlsbad Potashers - 1956-1957 
 Clovis Pioneers - 1956/ Clovis Redlegs - 1957
 El Paso Texans - 1956-1957 
 Hobbs Sports - 1956-1957 
 Midland Indians - 1956, then the Midland/Lamesa Indians - 1957 
 Pampa Oilers - 1956-1957 
 Plainview Ponies - 1956-1957 
 Pueblo Braves - 1956-1957
 Roswell Rockets - 1956 
 San Angelo Colts - 1956-1957

References 
 McCann, M. (n.d.). Minor League Baseball History. Retrieved April 27, 2007, from https://www.webcitation.org/query?url=http://www.geocities.com/big_bunko/total.htm&date=2009-10-25+13:34:30

Defunct minor baseball leagues in the United States
Baseball in Oklahoma
Baseball leagues in Louisiana
Baseball leagues in Texas
Baseball leagues in New Mexico
Baseball leagues in Oklahoma
Baseball leagues in Colorado
Baseball leagues in Kansas
Sports leagues established in 1887
Sports leagues disestablished in 1957